Fútbol Club Penya d'Andorra is an Andorran football team, based in Andorra La Vella. The team currently plays in the Primera Divisió.

History
FC Penya d'Andorra, formerly known as Associació Club Penya Encarnada d'Andorra, was founded in 2009 as a cultural association for the promotion of football and sport in the parish of Andorra la Vella in defense of the name and honor of the House of Benfica. The team was for the first time promoted to Primera Divisió after finishing first in the 2014–15 season of Segona Divisió.

Although the club was relegated the following season to Segona Divisió they competed a two-legged relegation play-off for one spot in 2017–18 Primera Divisió against FC Ordino. Penya Encarnada won 5–3 on aggregate and were promoted to Primera Divisió. After the 2018 relegation the club returned to the Primera Divisió in 2020.

Colors and badge
The original colors and badge invoked its Portuguese identity and were related, along with the local club Casa Estrella del Benfica, with the Portuguese club Benfica. The traditional club colors were red and black, thus given the club's nickname encarnados (the red ones), and the badge was a minor variation of the Benfica's sports club.

Honours
Segona Divisió: 
Winners (3): 2014–15, 2019–20, 2021-22

Recent seasons

Current squad
As of 14 January 2023

Personnel

Technical staff

References

Football clubs in Andorra
2009 establishments in Andorra
Association football clubs established in 2009